The Victoria Memorial is a sculpture placed at the centre of Victoria Square in Montreal, Quebec, Canada.

Overview 

The statue of Queen Victoria in the centre of Victoria Square is the work of sculptor Marshall Wood, and was unveiled in 1872 by Lord Dufferin, the Governor General of Canada. At the time, the area surrounding Victoria Square was a prestigious neighbourhood.

It was funded by donations from a citizens' committee, by public subscription, on the occasion of Prince Arthur’s year living in Montreal. The bronze was cast by Holbrook & Company, Chelsea, England in 1869.

Gallery

See also
 List of statues of Queen Victoria

References

External links

 Monument à la reine Victoria

1872 in Canada
1872 sculptures
Buildings and structures completed in 1872
Granite sculptures in Canada
History of Montreal
Monuments and memorials in Montreal
Montreal
Outdoor sculptures in Montreal
Royal monuments in Canada
Sculptures of women in Canada